Dick Couch is an American author, professor, and former U.S. Navy SEAL.

Early life and education
Couch was born in Mississippi and raised in Southern Indiana. He graduated from the United States Naval Academy in 1967. After attending Drone Anti-Submarine Helicopter (DASH) controller training, he reported aboard the naval destroyer . He graduated from Basic Underwater Demolition/SEAL (BUD/S) Class 45 in 1969, and was the class Honorman. He graduated first in his class at the Navy Underwater Swimmers School and the Army Free Fall (HALO) School. As Whiskey Platoon Commander with SEAL Team One in Vietnam, he led one of the few successful prisoner of war rescue operations of that conflict.

Career
Following his release from active duty service in the U.S. Navy, Couch served as a maritime and paramilitary case officer with the Central Intelligence Agency. In 1997, he retired from the Naval Reserve with the rank of Captain. At that time, he held the senior command billet in the SEAL reserve community.

Personal life
Couch and his wife, Julia, live in Idaho.  However, he is currently serving as a Professor of Ethics at the United States Naval Academy.

Bibliography

Fiction
Seal Team One (1991 )
Pressure Point (1993; 2006 )
Silent Descent (1994 )
 Rising Wind (1996 )
The Mercenary Option (2003 )
Covert Action (2005 )
Tom Clancy Presents: Act of Valor  (Novelization of film of the same name, 2012 )
Tom Clancy's Op-Center: Out of the Ashes (with George Galdorisi, 2014 )
Tom Clancy's Op-Center: Into the Fire (with George Galdorisi, 2015 )

Non-fiction
The Warrior Elite: The Forging of SEAL Class 228 (2003 )
U.S. Armed Forces Nuclear, Biological And Chemical Survival Manual 2003 
The Finishing School: Earning the Navy SEAL Trident (2005 )
Down Range: Navy SEALs in the War on Terrorism  (2006 )
Chosen Soldier: The Making of A Special Forces Warrior (2007 )
The Sheriff of Ramadi: Navy SEALs and the Winning of al-Anbar (2008 )
A Tactical Ethic: Moral Conduct in the Insurgent Battlespace (2010 )
Sua Sponte: The Forging of a Modern American Ranger (2012 )
Always Faithful, Always Forward: The Forging of a Special Operations Marine (2014 )
By Honor Bound: Two Navy SEALs, the Medal of Honor, and a Story of Extraordinary Courage Tom Norris and Mike Thornton, with Dick Couch  (2016 )

References

External links
 Dick Couch Interview on USNI Blog
C-SPAN Q&A interview with Couch, May 8, 2011

Year of birth missing (living people)
Living people
20th-century American novelists
American military writers
Novelists from Idaho
Place of birth missing (living people)
People from Mississippi
People from Blaine County, Idaho
People from Indiana in the Vietnam War
United States Navy captains
United States Navy SEALs personnel
United States Navy personnel of the Vietnam War
United States Naval Academy alumni
21st-century American novelists
American male novelists
United States Navy reservists
20th-century American non-fiction writers
21st-century American non-fiction writers
American male non-fiction writers
20th-century American male writers
21st-century American male writers